is a Japanese television drama series and the 98th Asadora series, following Warotenka. It premiered on April 2, 2018, and concluded on September 29, 2018. Mei Nagano was cast in the lead role of Suzume Nireno after an audition of 2366 women.

Plot
Suzume Nireno and Ritsu Hagio were born on the same day in 1971 in a small town in Gifu Prefecture. They grow up as close friends, with Suzume encouraging the smart but shy Ritsu, and Ritsu protecting Suzume, who lost hearing in one ear due to an illness. They are still close in high school, but their first romantic interests are directed at other people: for Ritsu, a beautiful girl in the archery club of another school; for Suzumu, a kind boy also from another school. Nothing much comes of either as they and their friends have to think of life after high school. Suzume plans to work but is only able to get a job at the local farmer's coop thanks to her grandfather's connections. Ritsu, however, has been lending her the shojo manga of Haori Akikaze, which inspire Suzume to draw her own manga.

When she meets Akikaze in person—who turns out to be a man—and shows him her work, he suddenly asks her to come work for him. She has to battle with her mother to let her go to Tokyo, but when she begins working for Akikaze, she finds out the main reason he hired her was for the rice treats her grandfather made. She convinces him to give her a test to earn her place as an apprentice. Meanwhile, Ritsu too is in Tokyo attending college and has made friends with Masato. Akikaze fires Suzume when he thinks she has thrown out an important draft of a manga, but when he discovers he just misplaced it, he travels to Gifu to bring her back and finally begin her real training as a manga artist. Around then, Ritsu re-encounters Saya, the archery girl, and the two begin dating. Suzume also begins to fall in love with Masato, but he rejects her, thinking she really belongs with Ritsu. But with Saya having grown jealous of Suzume, Ritsu decides to end all contact with Suzume.

The two rejections are a double whammy for Suzume, but Akikaze encourages her to express her feelings in creating manga. She, Yūko, and Makoto—Akikaze's apprentices—compete for a famous newcomer award, which Makoto wins, but has to withdraw after he earns Akikaze's ire for publishing another manga in a disreputable magazine. The award then goes to Suzume, who along with Yūko, gets to draw her first serialized manga. After several years, Yūko is the first to hit the brick wall and can't think of a new manga and ends up quitting. Suzume visits Gifu for the first time in a while and runs into Ritsu, who has broken up with Saya. He suddenly asks her to marry him, but she says it is impossible. She meant it was impossible at that time, but he took it differently. Soon afterwards Suzume's serialization also ends, but she gets additional bad news when she learns Ritsu has gotten married.

Always weak in storytelling, Suzume also fails to think of a new manga and quits. It's 1999 and she is 28 years old, so with no other prospects, she ends up working at a dollar store. There she meets Ryoji, the nephew of the three women who own the store. He's a budding filmmaker, working for the often-out-of-work director named Shohei Motosumiyoshi. Ryoji soon falls in love with Suzume. They decide to get married, and when Ryoji writes a screenplay based on a popular novel, he thinks this his chance to debut as a director, but Motosumiyoshi takes the job. Ryoji gives up on becoming a director and devotes himself to Suzume and their daughter Kano. A few years later, however, he catches the filmmaking bug again and, against Suzume's protests, leaves her and his daughter to pursue his career. Suzume returns to Gifu to find out that her younger brother Shota had revived the family restaurant with a new menu.

She also meets Ritsu again, who is in town looking after his sick mother Wako. Suzume decides to start a food stand selling goheimochi, learning the secret recipe from her grandfather Senkichi before he dies. She also helps Ritsu when Wako dies and even helps him mend ways with his wife, even though she still loves him. Learning of a place in Tokyo that lets you market your ideas on a small scale, and believing Kano has potential as an ice skater, Suzume decides to return to Tokyo. Things do not go well, however, as the company she works for goes under and her product ideas seem to go nowhere. But she does run into not only Masato, but also Ritsu, who has gotten divorced.

Teaming up with Ritsu, who quits his job, Suzume develops the idea of creating a fan that creates what feels like a natural, not artificial breeze. Ryoji reappears and helps them by making a promotional video, but Suzume rejects his proposal to reunite. After many experiments, Suzume and Ritsu finally succeed in creating a natural fan, but on the day they present it to investors, the Tōhoku earthquake happens. Suzume is shocked to hear that her friend Yūko died in the disaster, but she is determined to keep going, this time with Ritsu as her partner in life.

Cast

Nireno Family
Mei Nagano as Suzume Nireno
Yusa Yazaki as childhood Suzume
Yasuko Matsuyuki as Haru Nireno, Suzume's mother
Kenichi Takitō as Utaro Nireno, Suzume's father
Jun Fubuki as Renko Nireno, Suzume's grandmother/narrator
Masatoshi Nakamura as Senkichi Nireno, Suzume's grandfather
Kaisei Kamimura as Sōta Nireno, Suzume's brother
Ririna Yamazaki as Kano "Kan-chan" Nireno, Suzume's daughter

Hagio Family
Takeru Satō as Ritsu Hagio, Suzume's childhood friend
Kaito Takamura as childhood Ritsu
Tomoyo Harada as Wako Hagio, Ritsu's mother
Shōsuke Tanihara as Yaichi Hagio, Ritsu's father
Shizuka Ishibashi as Yoriko Hagio, Ritsu's wife
Ruito Yamashiro as Tsubasa Hagio, Ritsu's son

Saionji Family
Yuma Yamoto as Ryunosuke Saionji, Suzume's classmate
Haruyoshi Ōtake as childhood Ryunosuke
Seiji Rokkaku as Mitsuru Saionji, Ryunosuke's father
Yuriko Hirooka as Tomiko Saionji, Ryunosuke's mother
Maho Yamada as Reiko Sainoji, Ryunosuke's sister
Hinako Kouta as childhood Reiko

Kidahara Family
Nao as Nao Kidahara, Suzume's classmate
Aina Nishizawa as childhood Nao
Wataru Takagi as Gorō Kidahara, Nao's father
Nobue Iketani as Sachiko Kidahara, Nao's mother

Office Tinkerbell
Etsushi Toyokawa as Haori Akikaze, Suzume's manga teacher
Haruka Igawa as Wakana Hishimoto, Akikaze's manager
Nana Seino as Yūko Komiya, Akikaze's assistant
Jun Shison as Makoto Tōdo, Akikaze's assistant

Others
Kimiko Yo as Kimika Okada, the town doctor
Tomoya Nakamura as Masato Asai, Ritsu's college classmate
Seika Furuhata as Saya Itō
Eriko Satō as Hitomi Ogura
Nobuyuki Suzuki as Tōru Kanzaki
Shotaro Mamiya as Ryoji Moriyama, Suzume's former husband
Kyūsaku Shimada as Ichiro Tanabe
Takumi Saito as Shōhei Motosumiyoshi
Midoriko Kimura as Mitsue Fujimura
Yumi Asō as Mugi Fujimura
Risa Sudō as Meari Fujimura
Kōichi Yamadera as a doctor
Shin'ya Tsukamoto as Prof. Usakawa
Mayumi Wakamura as Yumiko Sano
Teppei Arita as Masahiko Tsumagari
Towa Araki as Shujiro Tsumagari
Manami Konishi as Keiko Kato
Daisuke Ono as the voice of Kagami yo Kagami
Yuta Koseki as Kento

References

External links
 

2018 Japanese television series debuts
2018 Japanese television series endings
Asadora
Television shows set in Gifu Prefecture